The al-Tawhid Brigade, named after Tawhid, the "oneness of God," was an armed Islamist insurgent group involved in the Syrian Civil War.

The al-Tawhid Brigade was formed in 2012. Reportedly backed by Qatar, al-Tawhid was considered one of the biggest groups in northern Syria, dominating much of the insurgency around Aleppo.

Affiliated with the Muslim Brotherhood, in late 2013 it co-signed a joint statement calling for Sharia law and rejecting the authority of the Syrian National Coalition.

Originally, al-Tawhid was composed of four subunits, the Mountain Knights Brigade, the Darat Izza Brigade, the Free North Brigade, and the Aleppo Shahba Battalions.

Its leader Abdul Qader Saleh was killed in November 2013 in a devastating Syrian Air Force airstrike. Its northern branch, the Free North Brigade, was in 2014 reportedly "superseded" by the Northern Sun Battalion (Shams al-Shamal).

Branches 

The Tawhid Brigade consisted was organized into three branches:
 The Free North Brigade, as the largest subunit of the Tawhid Brigade, was present in the Kilis Corridor and took over the leadership of several subunits in al-Bab to the east of Aleppo. On 16 June 2017, remnants of the group using its name joined the Sham Legion.
 The Mountain Knights Brigade operated in the southwest of Aleppo Governorate near the border with the Idlib Governorate and the city of Atarib.
 The Darat Izza Brigade, named after the town of Darat Izza, operated in the western part of the city of Aleppo.

By March 2013, the al-Tawhid Brigade had become active in northeastern and eastern Syria as well, where one of its representatives, Sheikh Saif, tried to set up a loose coalition of Islamist groups known as "Dschabhat Islami". Around June 2013, the militia was reorganised into nearly 30 sub-factions.

In November 2013, the Elite Islamic Battalion left the Tawhid Brigade.

On 2 March 2014, the Northern Storm Brigade announced that they would join the Islamic Front under the leadership of the al-Tawhid Brigade. Also in 2014, the Euphrates Jarabulus Battalions left to join the Dawn of Freedom Brigades.

At some point, the 1st Regiment was a member group of the Tawhid Brigade.

History

Formation
The al-Tawhid Brigade was formed in 2012 in order to coordinate the Battle of Aleppo, with the stated mission to found a "civil state in Syria with Islam being the main source of legislation."

Activities

In November 2012, the Tawhid Brigade announced their support for the Syrian National Coalition but called for greater representation in the coalition. The brigade's leadership called for "a civil state where the basis of legislation is the Islamic faith, with consideration for all the [minority] groups of Syria". They thereby implicitly rejected an earlier statement they had made, with other local factions, which had called for an Islamic state in Syria and denouncing the Syrian National Coalition.

In January 2013, the Tawhid Brigade announced on its website that it had become a member of the Syrian Islamic Liberation Front.

In May 2013, the hell cannon, a mortar-like improvised firearm designed and built by the insurgent group Free North Brigade, was first noted in the press.

In June 2013, Tawhid Brigade sent over 300 fighters under the command of Saleh and the Aleppo Military Council's Obaidi to the Battle of al-Qusayr.

In August 2013, the Islamic State of Iraq and the Levant (ISIL), the al-Nusra Front, Ahrar al-Sham, the Suqour al-Sham Brigade, and the al-Tawhid Brigade announced that they would besiege the YPG-held city of Kobanî. However, infighting between the groups erupted in January 2014 and some of them began to align with the YPG under the name of the Euphrates Islamic Liberation Front. In March 2014, ISIL captured Sarrin and several other towns and villages from the YPG and the EILF. Clashes continued through May 2014.

On 22 September 2013, the Tawhid Brigade joined the Islamic Front coalition. The group was formed largely from the Syrian Islamic Front and the Syrian Islamic Liberation Front, both of which were officially dissolved in the process.

On 24 September 2013, the Tawhid Brigade co-signed a statement with 11 other rebel groups which called for Sharia law and, allying with al-Qaeda, rejected the authority of the Syrian National Coalition.

Disintegration

On 14 November 2013, a Syrian Air Force airstrike bombarded an army base held by the al-Tawhid brigade in Aleppo killing a commander by the name of Youssef al-Abbas also injuring two others including al-Tawhid's head commander Abdul Qader Saleh. Saleh subsequently died of his wounds in a Turkish hospital.

Following the death of Saleh, the Tawhid Brigade reportedly suffered serious internal divisions and lost considerable members in defections to other rebel factions. They also experienced a sharp reduction in military assistance from Gulf states, due to US pressure to support more moderate rebel groups.

On 10 September 2014, the Tawhid Brigade's eastern branch became a founding member group of the Euphrates Volcano operations room based in Kobanî. By October 2014, al-Tawhid had seen many of its eastern Aleppo province affiliates becoming defunct but re-emerging as break-off groups, and its northern branch Free North Brigade being "superseded" by the Northern Sun Battalion (Shams al-Shamal). Some remnants of the Tawhid Brigade near Azaz allied itself with the People's Protection Units and received equipment and training from the CIA in late 2014.

Their fighters became a core part of the Levant Front as of 2015. However, in October 2016, 4 "battalions" of rebels in Aleppo using the flag of the Tawhid Brigade left the Levant Front and joined the Nour al-Din al-Zenki Movement.

See also
 List of armed groups in the Syrian Civil War

References

External links
 The formation of the Tawhid Brigade on 18 July 2012
 Youtube channel

Muslim Brotherhood
Sunni Islamist groups
Anti-government factions of the Syrian civil war
Organizations designated as terrorist by Syria
Organizations designated as terrorist by the United Arab Emirates
Organizations based in Asia designated as terrorist